The bagua or pakua (八卦) are a set of eight symbols that originated in China, used in Taoist cosmology to represent the fundamental principles of reality, seen as a range of eight interrelated concepts. Each consists of three lines, each line either "broken" or "unbroken", respectively representing yin or yang. Due to their tripartite structure, they are often referred to as Eight Trigrams in English.

The trigrams are related to Taiji philosophy, Taijiquan and the Wuxing, or "five elements". The relationships between the trigrams are represented in two arrangements: the Primordial, "Earlier Heaven", or "Fu Xi" bagua and the Manifested, "Later Heaven", or "King Wen" bagua. The trigrams have correspondences in astronomy, astrology, geography, geomancy, anatomy, the family, martial arts, Chinese medicine and elsewhere.

The ancient Chinese classic, I Ching (Pinyin: Yi Jing), consists of the 64 pairwise permutations of trigrams, referred to as "hexagrams",  along with commentary on each one.

Trigrams

There are eight possible combinations to render the various trigrams ( bāguà):

Relation to other principles

Book of Changes listed two sources for the eight trigrams. The chapter  explains the first source thus:

This explanation would later be modified to:

The trigrams are related to the five elements of Wu Xing, used by Feng Shui practitioners and in Traditional Chinese Medicine. Those five elements are Water, Wood, Fire, Earth and Metal.  The Water (Kan) and Fire (Li) trigrams correspond directly with the Water and Fire elements.  The element of Earth corresponds with both the trigrams of Earth (Kun) and Mountain (Gen). The element of Wood corresponds with the trigrams of Wind (Xun) (as a gentle but inexorable force that can erode and penetrate stone) and Thunder (Zhen). The element of Metal corresponds with the trigrams of Heaven (Qian) and Lake (Dui).

Hexagram lookup table

Fu Xi's "Earlier Heaven"

King Wen's "Later Heaven"

Bagua used in Feng Shui
The Bagua is an essential tool in the majority of Feng Shui schools. The Bagua used in Feng shui can appear in two different versions: the Earlier Heaven Bagua, used for burial sites, and the Later Heaven Bagua, used for the residences.

Primordial Bagua
In Primordial Bagua, also known as Fu Xi Bagua or Earlier Heaven Bagua, the Heaven is in the higher part and the Earth is in the lower part. The trigram Qian (Heaven) is at the top, the trigram Kun (Earth) is at the bottom (in the past, the South was located at the top in Chinese maps). The trigram Li (Fire) is located on the left and opposite to it is the trigram Kan (Water). Zhen (Thunder) and Xun (Wind) form another pair, while being one opposite the other, the first on the bottom left next to Li while the second is next to Qian on the top right of the Bagua. Gen (Mountain) and Dui (Lake) form the last pair, one opposite the other, both in balance and harmony. The adjustment of the trigrams is symmetrical by forming exact contrary pairs. They symbolize the opposite forces of Yin and Yang and represent an ideal state, when everything is in balance.

Manifested Bagua
The sequence of the trigrams in Manifested Bagua, also known as the Bagua of King Wen or Later Heaven Bagua, describes the patterns of the environmental changes. Kan is placed downwards and Li at the top, Zhen in the East and Dui in the West. Contrary to the Earlier Heaven Bagua, this one is a dynamic Bagua where energies and the aspects of each trigram flow towards the following. It is the sequence used by the Luo Pan compass which is used in Feng Shui to analyze the movement of the Qi that practitioners believe affect them.

Western Bagua
Feng shui was made very popular in the Occident thanks to the Bagua of the eight aspirations. Each trigram corresponds to an aspect of life which, in its turn, corresponds to one of the cardinal directions. Applying feng shui using the Bagua of the eight aspirations (or Bagua map for short) made it possible to simplify feng shui and to bring it within the reach of everyone. Western Bagua focuses more heavily on the power of intention than the traditional forms of feng shui.

Masters of traditional feng shui disregard this approach, for its simplicity, because it does not take into account the forms of the landscape or the temporal influence or the annual cycles. The Bagua of the eight aspirations is divided into two branches: the first, which uses the compass and cardinal directions, and the second, which uses the Bagua by using the main door. It is clear that, not taking into account the cardinal directions, the second is even more simplified.

Bagua map
A bagua map is a tool used in Western forms of feng shui to map a room or location and see how the different sections correspond to different aspects in one's life. These sections are believed to relate to every area or aspect of life and are divided into such categories as: fame, relationships/marriage, children/creativity, helpful people/travel, career, inner knowledge, family/ancestors/health, and wealth/blessings.

In this system, the map is intended to be used over the land, one's home, office or desk to find areas lacking good chi, and to show where there are negative or missing spaces that may need rectifying or enhancing in life or the environment.

For example, if the bagua grid is placed over the entire house plan and it shows the toilet, bathroom, laundry, or kitchen in the wealth/blessings area it would be considered that the money coming into that particular environment would disappear very fast, as if to be 'going down the drain.'

In Unicode
The bagua symbols are in the Miscellaneous Symbols block of Unicode:

The constituent ⚋ yin and ⚊ yang bars that form them are also encoded in the Miscellaneous Symbols block, as are the digrams ⚌, ⚏, ⚍, and ⚎.

The hexagrams they form are separately encoded as the Yijing Hexagram Symbols Unicode block.

Tools

A LaTeX package TikZ-Bagua can be used to draw the symbols.

In culture
In Peking Opera, a role that has Taoist technique or military strategy wears a costume decorated with Taiji and Bagua.

Baguazhang and Taijiquan are two Chinese martial arts based on principles derived from bagua.

The principles of Bagua are used in a form of traditional Acupuncture where the prenatal, early heaven arrangements and the postnatal, later heaven arrangements are used to select points specifically related or tailored to the patients constitution to treat illness or disease.

The 2004 Philippine horror film Feng Shui and its 2014 sequel, Feng Shui 2, revolves around a cursed bagua mirror that kills those who stare into it.

Other adoptions
Singapore dollar: the one dollar coin is shaped like a bagua.
Flag of South Korea: a flag  that has four trigrams surrounding the taegeuk.
Flag of South Vietnam: the three stripes is said as a trigram representing "south".
Tekes County and Zhuge Village: both these communities has a layout based on bagua.

See also
Tian gan and Di zhi: the archaic calendar system of East Asia.
Ba Xian, Eight Taoist Immortals
Ba Mai (qí jīng bā mài)
Ba Duan Jin
Chinese ritual mastery traditions
Chinese spiritual world concepts
Fuji (planchette writing)
Fulu
Octal

Note

References

Chinese words and phrases
Esoteric cosmology
I Ching
Symbolism
Taoist cosmology
Eastern esotericism